Chocolate coins, or chocolate money, are foil-covered chocolates in the shape of coins.

History
As a Christmas tradition, the chocolate coin giving is said to be inspired by the deeds of Saint Nicholas in the fourth century, with chocolate coins introduced some time after chocolate's introduction into Europe in the sixteenth century.

United Kingdom
In the United Kingdom, chocolate coins mimic the design of real money; they are traditionally bought around Christmas and are used to decorate the Christmas tree and to fill the stockings of children. When children visit a friend or relative they are allowed to find and take chocolates from the tree as a treat. A variant of this is that chocolate coins are hidden somewhere in the house for children to find, often in the form of a treasure trail.

Hannukah Gelt 
During the Jewish festival of Hanukkah, chocolate coins are sometimes given to children in addition or in replacement of the traditional gelt (gift of money), typically with a dreidel.

Chinese New Year 
At Chinese New Year, in place of traditional Hongbao or 'lucky money', chocolate coins are sometimes now given.

See also

 Hanukkah gelt
 List of candies

References

Chocolate
Christmas food
Sinterklaas food